Singiloncheon Station is a railway station on Seoul Subway Line 4 in Ansan, Korea.

As hot springs were expected to be developed at the time of the station's opening, the station was opened as Singiloncheon station (新吉溫泉驛, meaning Singil Hot Spring). However, the station was renamed on January 20, 2021, due to the lack of development of hot springs around the station. But the actual station name "Singiloncheon", was not modified around the station, on the announcements and route maps due to protests supporting hot springs to be built around the station. So it is technically "Singiloncheon" until KORAIL actually renames the station.

Station layout

References

Metro stations in Ansan
Seoul Metropolitan Subway stations
Railway stations opened in 2000